Phuwatapa Village is an electoral sub-division or ward in Ishibu vdc of Terhathum District, Kosi Zone in the eastern development region of Nepal. It had a population of about 500 people in 60 households according to the census of 2011 AD conducted in Nepal. This village is situated on the lap of the Himalayas.

Geography and climate 
With the view of climate, it has a climate moderate and favorable for crops like paddy, maize, wheat bucket, wheat and many more. Temperature can be found about 17 °C to 20 °C in minimum around the village or the same climate can be found even in all areas of Ishibu whereas the temperature can be found 30 °C to 37 °C in maximum since it is in hilly region.

Literature and education 
As a matter of fact, there is a lower secondary school at the centre of two subdivision number called bhetwal Gau and phuwatapa itself which is responsible to offer education for up to grade 8 and all the graduates passed that grade will be transferred to any other schools as their wishes. Most of the children and adults in this village are found to have a golden approach to receive basic education to higher education in contrast with that of past days.

Healthcare centre 
People are  not so suffered to get their emergency and basis treatment, as there is already a healthcare centre at the centre point of all 9 sub division numbers. A health post is exists near  phuwatapa & due to the reason, the peoples of this village are enjoying with the basic treatment provided by the health post

References

Populated places in Tehrathum District